Bishwamvarpur or Bishwambarpur, is an upazila of Sunamganj District in the Division of Sylhet, Bangladesh.

Geography
It has 19705 households and total area 127.76 km2.

Demographics
As of the 1991 Bangladesh census, Bishwamvarpur has a population of 106182. Males constitute 50.96% of the population, and females 49.04%. This Upazila's eighteen up population is 52628. Bishwamvarpur has an average literacy rate of 17.2% (7+ years), and the national average of 32.4% literate. Religions: Muslim 80.3%, Hindu 19.5%, and others 0.2%.

Administration
Bishwamvarpur Upazila is divided into five union parishads: Dakshin Badaghat, Dhanpur, Fatepur, Palash, and Solukabad. The union parishads are subdivided into 61 mauzas and 184 villages.

See also
Upazilas of Bangladesh
Districts of Bangladesh
Divisions of Bangladesh

References

Upazilas of Sunamganj District